Santavuori is a Finnish surname. Notable people with the surname include:

 Tuomas Santavuori (born 1985), Finnish ice hockey player
 Usko Santavuori (1922–2003), Finnish sensationalist radio reporter

Finnish-language surnames